Parliamentary elections were held in North Korea on 2 November 1986. 655 Deputies were elected to the parliament.

The agenda of the first session of the elected eighth Supreme People's Assembly was "For the complete victory of socialism".

Under the 1972 Constitution, the number of seats in the Assembly was 655. This was increased to 687 following the 1986 election.

Results

Elected members
The following were elected as members of parliament:

 Electoral District (Mangyongdae): So Yun-sok
 Electoral District (Chilgol): Kang Chun-ho
 Electoral District (Kunggol): Yu Kyu-tong
 Electoral District (Tangsang): Kim Yong-pok
 Electoral District (Sonnae): Kim Pok-sil
 Electoral District (Panpyong): Pak Tae-hun
 Electoral District (Kwangbok): Chon Kwang-chun
 Electoral District (Mansu): Kim Ok-sim
 Electoral District (Chungsong): Cheo Hye-suk
 Electoral District (Yonhwa): Kim Ung-sang
 Electoral District (Changgwang): Yi Hyu-mong
 Electoral District (Ongnyu): Kim Chi-hang
 Electoral District (Chongnyu): Chi Chong-ae
 Electoral District (Tongmun): Yi Sun-im
 Electoral District (Munhung): Yom Tae-chun
 Electoral District (Tapche): Kim Pyong-kon
 Electoral District (Sagok): O Chae-won
 Electoral District (Viam): 
 Electoral District (Songyo): Yi Hwa-sun
 Electoral District (Namsin): Kim Hoe-il
 Electoral District (Sanop): Pak Chun-hung
 Electoral District (Tungme): Kim In-hwa
 Electoral District (Yulgok): Kim Kyong-suk
 Electoral District (Ansan): Pak Nyong-hui
 Electoral District (Ponghak): Yi Chong-yul
 Electoral District (Yukkyo): Chon Yong-ki
 Electoral District (Kansong): Na Chong-hui
 Electoral District (Yonmot): Hong To-hwan
 Electoral District (Changgyong): Yi Hwa-yong
 Electoral District (Hasin): Paek Chang-yong
 Electoral District (Chungsin): O Ki-su
 Electoral District (Harimsan): Kang Tok-su
 Electoral District (Wonbong): Yi Chun
 Electoral District (Chijangsan): Kim Yong-cho
 Electoral District (Hwoebul): Yi Chun-ku
 Electoral District (Hyokson): Kim Yong-tae
 Electoral District (Taesongsan): Chon In-tok
 Electoral District (Sinri): Kim Chung-nin
 Electoral District (Munsin): Yun Pyong-kwon
 Electoral District (Saesallim): Kim Tong-nyon
 Electoral District (Samma): Hong Si-kun
 Electoral District (Unpasan): No Ui-hwa
 Electoral District (Sojang): Kang Sun-hui
 Electoral District (Potonggang): Pak Mun-chan
 Electoral District (Kyonghung): Han Ati-su
 Electoral District (Pulgungori): Yang Se-kon
 Electoral District (Moran): Tae Pyong-yol
 Electoral District (Chonsung): Nam Sun-hui
 Electoral District (Pipa): Yi Kye-paek
 Electoral District (Kinmaul): Choe In-tok
 Electoral District (Kumsu): Hong Pom-kil
 Electoral District (Yonghung): Kim Song-yul
 Electoral District (Yongbuk): Chon Mun-sop
 Electoral District (Anhak): O Sang-nok
 Electoral District (Kobang): Yi Tan
 Electoral District (Haebang): Iim Hwa-suk
 Electoral District (Kuwolsan): Kim Yong-wan
 Electoral District (Songsin): Choe Kil-sun
 Electoral District (Mirim): Yi Tong-chun
 Electoral District (Ihyon): Kim Chin-suk
 Electoral District (Chongbaek): Ho Pok-tok
 Electoral District (Wonam): Pak Tae-ho
 Electoral District (Yongnam): Kim Tong-chun
 Electoral District (Sopo): Pak Yong-sok
 Electoral District (Sangdang): Kim Ha-kyu
 Electoral District (Hadang): Paek Sol-hui
 Electoral District (Singan): Yi Sin-cha
 Electoral District (Haksan): Kim Kil-san
 Electoral District (Yonggung): Mun Tok-hwan
 Electoral District (Yongchu): Hwang San-ho
 Electoral District (Oun): Ho Jong-suk
 Electoral District (Hwasong): Yu Pyong-yun
 Electoral District (Konji): Choe Sung-chon
 Electoral District (Haebal): Sim Tae-kyun
 Electoral District (Yokpo): Yi Sung-hui
 Electoral District (Taehyon): Kang Hui-won
 Electoral District (Sungho): Tak Hyong-che
 Electoral District (Matan): Pyon Ung-hui
 Electoral District (Songmun): Nam Sang-nak
 Electoral District (Todok): Yi Chu-ung
 Electoral District (Yokchon): Chon Mun-uk
 Electoral District (Sokpak): Choe Tae-pok
 Electoral District (Kangdong): Pak Song-chol
 Electoral District (Ponghwa): Kim Po-pi
 Electoral District (Hukyong): Choe Su-san
 Electoral District (Songga): Kim Il-chol
 Electoral District (Hari): Han Pong-nyo
 Electoral District (Chunghwa): Cho Myong-nok
 Electoral District (Myongwol): Son Song-pil
 Electoral District (Changsan): Cho Chil-song
 Electoral District (Majang): Kim Su-ui
 Electoral District (Kangnam): Chi Chang-ui
 Electoral District (Yupo): Kim Ki-ha
 Electoral District (Changhang): Yu Chun-ok
 Electoral District (Sangwon): Kim Ki-nam
 Electoral District (Posonggang): Kim Sang-rin
 Electoral District (Pyongsong): Han Chang-kun
 Electoral District (Tumu): Pak Chong-hyon
 Electoral District (Chungdok): Yang Hyong-sop
 Electoral District (Chigyong): Hwang In-sop
 Electoral District (Samwha): Cho Mi-ri
 Electoral District (Kuwol): Choe Tong-hui
 Electoral District (Haksu): Tak Chong-suk
 Electoral District (Onchon): Sin Sang-kyun
 Electoral District (Sohwa): Han Chan-ok
 Electoral District (Porim): Kim Yong-chan
 Electoral District (Chungsan): Yi Hyong-su
 Electoral District (Pungjong): Pak Chong-su
 Electoral District (Sokda): Chu Chang-chun
 Electoral District (Taedong): Hwang Chang-yop
 Electoral District (Yongok): Pak Tae-kap
 Electoral District (Sijong): Han Yong-hye
 Electoral District (Pyongwoti): Yim Chun-chu
 Electoral District (Opa): Kim Yong-ok
 Electoral District (Unbong): Yim Nok-chae
 Electoral District (Hanchon): No Chong-hui
 Electoral District (Sukchon): Kim Si-hak
 Electoral District (Yongdok): Kim Ui-sun
 Electoral District (Unjong): Kim Yong-mu
 Electoral District (Kumpung): Han Sun-hui
 Electoral District (Komhung): Pak Il-hwan
 Electoral District (Mundok): Yi Chun-son
 Electoral District (Ipsok): Kim Kum-ok
 Electoral District (Yongo): Kim Tong-myong
 Electoral District (Sangbong): Kang Song-san
 Electoral District (Kimungum): Kim Ho-kyong
 Electoral District (Sinanju): Kim Ki-pom
 Electoral District (Anju): Hyon Ung-sil
 Electoral District (Sangso): Kwak Tae-sam
 Electoral District (Yonggye): Chang Won-sun
 Electoral District (Namhung): Choe Han-chun
 Electoral District (Songdo): Chu Kil-pon
 Electoral District (Kaechon): Mun Su-ok
 Electoral District (Namjon): Yang In-ho
 Electoral District (Sambong): Pak Yong-sop
 Electoral District (Pobu): Yi Myo-nyo
 Electoral District (Hunu): Yu Sang-kol
 Electoral District (Choyang): Yun Ung-su
 Electoral District (Yongjin): Ho Nam-ki
 Electoral District (Yongwon): Kim Yong-yon
 Electoral District (Mukbang): Kim Pong-ul
 Electoral District (Chunhyok): Chong-To-son
 Electoral District (Sunchon): No Pok-hwa
 Electoral District (Subok): Kim Chong-wan
 Electoral District (Daedok): So Chae-hung
 Electoral District (.Kumsan): Kim Chong-sil
 Electoral District (Yonpo): Hyon Mu-kwang
 Electoral District (Yonbong): Chon Ung-su
 Electoral District (Changson): Han Chong-ho
 Electoral District (Puhung): Kim Che-min
 Electoral District (Osa): Yi Chong-kun
 Electoral District (Chonsong): Kim Nam-kyo
 Electoral District (Kubong): Kim Chi-hyop
 Electoral District (Chaedong): Kim Chong-suk
 Electoral District (Chudok): Choe Myong-kun
 Electoral District (Songchon): Yi Chong-u
 Electoral District (Kunja): Kim Pong-chu
 Electoral District (Sinsongchoh): Yi Yong-pu
 Electoral District (Changnim): Pak Son-pil
 Electoral District (Tokam): Yang In-kil
 Electoral District (Huichang): Won Chong-sam
 Electoral District (Sungin): Chon Hui-chong
 Electoral District (Taekin): Kim Yong-taek
 Electoral District (Sinyang): An Myong-ok
 Electoral District (Kwanghung): Kim Ung-chol
 Electoral District (Yangdok): Yun Ki-chong
 Electoral District (Unha): Kim Ok-nyon
 Electoral District (Pukchang): Yi Chi-chan
 Electoral District (Okchon): Yang Yong-kon
 Electoral District (Sungni): Yi Won-kwan
 Electoral District (Changmal): O Yong-pang
 Electoral District (Kongwon): So Mong-chun
 Electoral District (Chahgsang): Kim Choi-won
 Electoral District (Chongsong): Kong Chin-tae
 Electoral District (Hyongbong): Kim Hak-pong
 Electoral District (Chenam): Kim Kwang-chin
 Electoral District (Sungnisan): Sonu Chon-il
 Electoral District (Maengsan): Pak Kil-yon
 Electoral District (Yongwon): Cho Myong-son
 Electoral District (Taehung): Choe Sang-uk
 Electoral District (Nagwon): Yon Hyong-muk
 Electoral District (Yonsang): Choe Tok-sin
 Electoral District (Songhan): Kim Kyong-suk
 Electoral District (Majon): Song Tae-yon
 Electoral District (Chinson): Sonu Munrhung
 Electoral District (Kwanmun): Chu Song-il
 Electoral District (Paeksa): Kwon Hybng-suk
 Electoral District (Minpo): Yi Kum-nyo
 Electoral District (Miruk): So Chin-sok
 Electoral District (Pihyon): Chong In-chun
 Electoral District (Yangchaek): Yi Pyong-kuk
 Electoral District (Paekma): Chong Song-nam
 Electoral District (Yongchon): Kim Hui-sam
 Electoral District (Yangso): Kim Chang-chu
 Electoral District (Pukchung): Pak Myong-chun
 Electoral District (Yongampo): Kim Kypng-su
 Electoral District (Tasan): Yi Song-ho
 Electoral District (Yomju): Kim Chong-hui
 Electoral District (Oeha): Mun Song-sul
 Electoral District (Yongaksan): Yi Man-tae
 Electoral District (Cholsan): Kil Chun-sik
 Electoral District (Yonsu): Ha Kuk-song
 Electoral District (Tongnim): Chong Tae-ik
 Electoral District (Singok): Kim Yong-sim
 Electoral District (Kokunyong): Yo Yon-ku
 Electoral District (Sonchon): Kim Pyong-kil
 Electoral District (Noha): Rang Pong-kyu
 Electoral District (Sokhwa): Yi Yong-su
 Electoral District (Kwaksan): Chang Ki-yong
 Electoral District (Anui): Yi Ha-sop
 Electoral District (Chongju): Kim Ok-hyon
 Electoral District (Wolyang): Hyon Chun-kuk
 Electoral District (Chimhyang): Kim Song-kuk
 Electoral District (Osan): Choe Sun-chol
 Electoral District (Kohyon): Hong Wan-tae
 Electoral District (Yongnam): Ki Kyong-yul
 Electoral District (Unjon): Yang Wang-pok
 Electoral District (Unam): Pang Ae-son
 Electoral District (Kasan): Kim Yong-chun
 Electoral District (Pakchon): Kang Pong-ok
 Electoral District (Maengjung): Yim Chae-man
 Electoral District (Songsok): Kim Pong-mo
 Electoral District (Yonbyon): Yi Yong
 Electoral District (Pakwon): Yi Myon-sang
 Electoral District (Kujang): Paek Hak-nim
 Electoral District (Yongdung): Han Kyu-chung
 Electoral District (Yongmun): Kim Kun-su
 Electoral District (Yongchol): Kil Ok-hyon
 Electoral District (Suku): Sin Kyong-sik
 Electoral District (Unsan): Chong Chun-ki
 Electoral District (Pukchin): Yu Kye-chin
 Electoral District (Songbong): Yim Tae-yong
 Electoral District (Taechon): Kim Pyong-yul
 Electoral District (Hakbong): Sok Yun-ki
 Electoral District (Sinbong): Yi O-song
 Electoral District (Songan): Sonu Pyong-ku
 Electoral District (Chahung): Pak Nam-gi
 Electoral District (Chongnyon): Kim Chae-yon
 Electoral District (Pakesok): Chang Chang-mun
 Electoral District (Panghyon): Ko Kum-sun
 Electoral District (Unyang): Kim Chae-yong
 Electoral District (Chonma): Chong Song-ok
 Electoral District (Uiju): Hong Il-chon
 Electoral District (Yonha): Kim Yu-pung
 Electoral District (Tokhyon): Han Ki-chang
 Electoral District (Sakju): Pak Song-sil
 Electoral District (Pungnyon): Yunln-hyon
 Electoral District (Supung): Han Chong-kon
 Electoral District (Namsa): Choe Yun-to
 Electoral District (Taekwan): Yi Chang-son
 Electoral District (Yangsan): Kim Sok-hyon
 Electoral District (Changsong): Kim Yu suk
 Electoral District (Tongchang): Kim Mun-kap
 Electoral District (Pyokdong): Cho Sa-yong
 Electoral District (Sorim): Choe Hak-kun
 Electoral District (Solmoru): Yi Tu-ik
 Electoral District (Yokpyong): Yi Son-sil
 Electoral District (Chupyong): Kim Song-hun
 Electoral District (Chonsin): Cho Yong-sik
 Electoral District (Chongpyong): An Hui-kon
 Electoral District (Tongsin): Cho Kuk-yong
 Electoral District (Yongmin): Kim Chae-yul
 Electoral District (Hakmu): Kim Hui-yong
 Electoral District (Chinchon): Chong Chun-sil
 Electoral District (Unsong): Kim Sundae
 Electoral District (Songgan): Choe Ung-nok
 Electoral District (Songyong): Kim Hwan
 Electoral District (Songha): No Chong-hwan
 Electoral District (Songwon): Pak Song-won
 Electoral District (Kopung): Choe Jae-u
 Electoral District (Usi): Choe Yong-nim
 Electoral District (Chosan): Cho Sung-ho
 Electoral District (Wiwon): O Song-yol
 Electoral District (Yanggang): Han Song-yong
 Electoral District (Kosan): Kim Kyong-chang
 Electoral District (Kangan): Yi To-won
 Electoral District (Tunggong): Kim Un-ha
 Electoral District (Sijung): Yi Nam-son
 Electoral District (Sokhyon): So Yun-sok
 Electoral District (Namchon): Pyon Yong-se
 Electoral District (Chungsong): Yang Ok-nyo
 Electoral District (Woeryong): Yi Won-ok
 Electoral District (Sinmun): Ko Chun-il
 Electoral District (Yonju): Kim Son-taek
 Electoral District (Changgang): Hwang Chae-kyong
 Electoral District (Changjasan): Pak Song-ok
 Electoral District (Oil): Choe Yong-il
 Electoral District (Nangnim): Kim Sun-yong
 Electoral District (Hwapyong): Yi Pong-kil
 Electoral District (Chasong): Kim Wol-son
 Electoral District (Chunggang): Yi Chun-song
 Electoral District (Onchon): Yu Sun-ae
 Electoral District (Hakchon): Han Sang-kyu
 Electoral District (Anak): Kim Yong-ok
 Electoral District (Kyongji): O Chun-sim
 Electoral District (Taechu): Yi In-pok
 Electoral District (Chaeryong): O Jin-u
 Electoral District (Samjigang): Ho Nam-sun
 Electoral District (Changguk): Kim Won-tu
 Electoral District (Pukchi): Yang Ki-chin
 Electoral District (Sinchon): Han Tok-su
 Electoral District (Saenal): Kim Ki-hwan
 Electoral District (Yongdang): Kim Chol-myong
 Electoral District (Hwasan): Yu Chong-hyon
 Electoral District (Samchon): Yi Um-chon
 Electoral District (Talchon): Pang Hak-se
 Electoral District (Ullyul): Chong Ki-yong
 Electoral District (Changnyon): Paek Nam-il
 Electoral District (Ullyul Mine): Yi Cha-pang
 Electoral District (Sindae): No Pyong-sik
 Electoral District (Kwail): Kang Hyon-su
 Electoral District (Songhwa): Kim Tong-won
 Electoral District (Changyon): Sin Won-kyu
 Electoral District (Nagyon): Yu Suk-kun
 Electoral District (Yongyon): Chong Yon-hwa
 Electoral District (Kumi): Yi Ho-rim
 Electoral District (Taetan): Kim Song-hwa
 Electoral District (Popyong): Chong Pong-hwa
 Electoral District (Ongjin): Pak Kun-song
 Electoral District (Namhae): Paek Pom-su
 Electoral District (Samsan): Choe Kye-son
 Electoral District (Manjin): Chang Tong-sun
 Electoral District (Handong): Chong Yang-sang
 Electoral District (Kangnyong): Choe Yol-hui
 Electoral District (Pupo): No Muri-yol
 Electoral District (Ssanggyo): Yi Mong-ho
 Electoral District (Pyoksong): An Tal-su
 Electoral District (Chukchon): Ham Won-chang
 Electoral District (Haeju): Mun Yong-sun
 Electoral District (Uppa): Chon Yon-sik
 Electoral District (Okkye): Kim Yong-son
 Electoral District (Soae): Min Ung-sik
 Electoral District (Taegok): Yi Hong-ku
 Electoral District (Hakhyon): Chon Chin-su
 Electoral District (Okdong): Song Sun-chang
 Electoral District (Sinwon): Chong Kyong-hui
 Electoral District (Muhak): Kim Kap-sun
 Electoral District (Pyongchon): Yu Myong-hak
 Electoral District (Sindap): Yi Sang-ik
 Electoral District (Chongdan): Kim Hu-pun
 Electoral District (Sinsaeng): Kim Song-ae
 Electoral District (Toktal): Kim Yun-hyok
 Electoral District (Chongjong): Yi Hyon-son
 Electoral District (Chontae): Yi Tok-chung
 Electoral District (Ohyon): So Kwan-hui
 Electoral District (Yonjon): Yi Sun-ae
 Electoral District (Yonan): Kim Sang-nyon
 Electoral District (Haewol): Yi Nak-pin
 Electoral District (Paechon): Yi Sok-chin
 Electoral District (Chongchon): Won Su-pok
 Electoral District (Kumsong): Chon Pil-nyo
 Electoral District (Kumgok): Pak Myhong-pin
 Electoral District (Pyonghwa): Chon Kum-son
 Electoral District (Sariwon): Pak Ha-yong
 Electoral District (Pungni): Kang Myong-ok
 Electoral District (Unhadong): Paek Sol
 Electoral District (Torim): Pak Ki-so
 Electoral District (Sangmae): Kim Chong-suk
 Electoral District (Taesong): Yi Chang-kil
 Electoral District (Kuchon): Yi Chong-sun
 Electoral District (Taeunsan): Yi Man-kol
 Electoral District (Chongbang): An Hui-chan
 Electoral District (Songnim): Kye Ung-thae
 Electoral District (Kotpin): Choe Hyon-ki
 Electoral District (Chondong): Yun Ae-sun
 Electoral District (Hwangju): So Choi
 Electoral District (Chimchon): Cho Hye-suk
 Electoral District (Hukkyo): Kang Song-kun
 Electoral District (Soksan): U Tal-che
 Electoral District (Sindok): An Yon-suk
 Electoral District (Yontan): Choe Chong-nim
 Electoral District (Kumbong): Han Tal-son
 Electoral District (Pongsan): Kwak Sun-tok
 Electoral District (Chonggye): Kang Yong-kol
 Electoral District (Chongbang): Kim Kuk-tae
 Electoral District (Unpa): Song Tong-sop
 Electoral District (Kangalli): Han Chong-song
 Electoral District (Kwangmyong): Choe Mun-son
 Electoral District (Insan): Yi Um-chon
 Electoral District (Taechon): Kim Ybng-un
 Electoral District (Sohung): YI Chin-kyu
 Electoral District (Hwagok): Mun Chang-kuk
 Electoral District (Chajak): Choe Song-hye
 Electoral District (Suan): Kang Sok-chu
 Electoral District (Namjong): Yi Kwang-u
 Electoral District (Yonsan): Kim Yu-sun
 Electoral District (Sinpyong): Chong Chang-ik
 Electoral District (Mannyon): Kim Yong-ho
 Electoral District (Koksan): Han Yun-kil
 Electoral District (Pyongam): Nam Ki-hwan
 Electoral District (Singye): Kang Sok-sung
 Electoral District (Chuchon): Kim Pok-mun
 Electoral District (Chongbong): Kim Hyong-chong
 Electoral District (Masan): Kim Chin-hwa
 Electoral District (Pyongsan): Pak Chang-yong
 Electoral District (Wahyon): Yi Su-chin
 Electoral District (Chongsu): Cho Sun-paek
 Electoral District (Chonghak): O In-hyon
 Electoral District (Kimchon): Chang Choi
 Electoral District (Wonmyong): Chu Sung-nam
 Electoral District (Tosan): Yi Yong-tong
 Electoral District (Anbong): Chu To-il
 Electoral District (Chonnae): Ho Tarn
 Electoral District (Hwara): Kim Sun-na
 Electoral District (Okpyong): U Tu-tae
 Electoral District (Munchon): No Sa-pom
 Electoral District (Munpyong): Yun Ki-pok
 Electoral District (Segil): Yi Hyong-sik
 Electoral District (Wau): Yi Ki-tok
 Electoral District (Yangji): Kim Kwang-chu
 Electoral District (Pongchun): Nam Si-u
 Electoral District (Chungchong): Kim U-shong
 Electoral District (Changchon): Hong Chong-ku
 Electoral District (Pongmak): Chong Ho-kyun
 Electoral District (Songhung): An Tan-sil
 Electoral District (Changjon): Chu Ui-yop
 Electoral District (Paehwa): Yi Sun-kum
 Electoral District (Anbyon): Kim Tu-nam
 Electoral District (Solbong): Chong Chol-su
 Electoral District (Kosanup): Chong Sin-hyok
 Electoral District (Pupyong): Kim Sang-ho
 Electoral District (Sinhyon): Han Hung-nam
 Electoral District (Nyoja): Kim Kyong-chan
 Electoral District (Tongchon): Yi Un-sun
 Electoral District (Kuup): Kim Taek-su
 Electoral District (Kosong): Jang Song-thaek
 Electoral District (Onjong): Kwon Sun-ok
 Electoral District (Wolbisan): Han Sang-yo
 Electoral District (Soksa): Choe Pok-yon
 Electoral District (Kumgang): Yu Ho-chun
 Electoral District (Chihyesan): Kim Yang-pu
 Electoral District (Changdo): Yi Chin-su
 Electoral District (Hakpang): Ko Tae-pung
 Electoral District (Kimwa): Pak Sang-yun
 Electoral District (Hoeyang): Kim Pong-yul
 Electoral District (Sindong): Cho Hui-won
 Electoral District (Chollyong): An Pyong-mo
 Electoral District (Sepo): Chang Song-u
 Electoral District (Chungpyong): Yim Hyong-ku
 Electoral District (Paeksan): Sin Tok-kun
 Electoral District (Pokkye): Kim Haeng-yon
 Electoral District (Pyonggang): Chon Chae-son
 Electoral District (Choksan): Yi Kyae-san
 Electoral District (Naeimm): Chong Tu-hwan
 Electoral District (Cholwon): Sin In-ha
 Electoral District (Anhyop): Chon Kyong-kun
 Electoral District (Yichon): Pak In-pin
 Electoral District (Songbuk): Hon Ki-mun
 Electoral District (Pangyo): Yi Yong-ho
 Electoral District (Poptong): Kwon Yi-sun
 Electoral District (Komdok): Kim Che-dong
 Electoral District (Kumgol): Jon Ha-chol
 Electoral District (Yongyang): Kim Pil-han
 Electoral District: N/A
 Electoral District (Munam): Chong Mun-su
 Electoral District (Tanchon): Yu Hyong-num
 Electoral District (Hanggu): Hwang Ha-chong
 Electoral District (Sindanchon): Yu Yong-sop
 Electoral District (Chikchol): Kang Sung-yong
 Electoral District (Ssangyong): Chong Chun-chong
 Electoral District (Hqchon): Yi Chong-ho
 Electoral District (Yongwon): Kwon Chong-hyop
 Electoral District (Sangnong): Cho Yun-hui
 Electoral District (Yiwon): Kim Choi-man
 Electoral District (Chaejong): Yi Yong-kyun
 Electoral District (Mahung): Sin Yong-tok
 Electoral District (Pukchong): An Pyong-mu
 Electoral District (Chonghung): Yi Chung-song
 Electoral District (Sinbukchong): Pak Su-dong
 Electoral District (Songnam): Cho Chong-chol
 Electoral District (Sinchang): Choe Sun-tae
 Electoral District (Toksong): Kim Won-kyun
 Electoral District (Samgi): Han Man-hi
 Electoral District (Sokhu): Yi Sung-ki
 Electoral District (Yanghwa): Un Choi
 Electoral District (Ohang): Yi Won-su
 Electoral District (Sinpo): Yi Chong-kyun
 Electoral District (Pungo): Yi Chae-hwan
 Electoral District (Unpo): Hyon Chol-kyu
 Electoral District (Sanyang): Hong Won-pyo
 Electoral District (Hongwon): Choe Kwang
 Electoral District (Sojung): Choe Chang-hak
 Electoral District (Samho): Paek In-chun
 Electoral District (Yoho): Kwori Sang-ho
 Electoral District (Soho): Kim Yun-sang
 Electoral District (Yujong): Kang Yun-kun
 Electoral District (Chongi): Maeng Tae-ho
 Electoral District (Hungdok): Sin Tae-hyon
 Electoral District (Hungso): Chi Chang-se
 Electoral District (Subyon): Cho Tae+hi
 Electoral District (Hojon): Kim Chung-il
 Electoral District (Sapo): Choe Chong-yong
 Electoral District (Changhung): Pak Pong-yong
 Electoral District (Toksan): Hong Chun-sil
 Electoral District (Chongsong): Chong Mun-yong
 Electoral District (Hoesang): Hong Yong-ok
 Electoral District (Pyongsu): Chong Hui-chol
 Electoral District (Hasinhung): Yi Chun-sim
 Electoral District (Samil): Yu Kwi-chin
 Electoral District (Nammun): Choe Chong-sun
 Electoral District (Kumsa): Yi Chun-hwa
 Electoral District (Tonghungsan): Kim Yong-yon
 Electoral District (Sosang): Choe Yong-hae
 Electoral District (Pyngho): Yo Chun-sok
 Electoral District (Soun): Cha Yong-pyo
 Electoral District (Kwangdok): Yi Pil-sang
 Electoral District (Sangjung): Yi Ul-sol
 Electoral District (Tongbong): Yi Yong-ae
 Electoral District (Hamju): Yi Kyong-son
 Electoral District (Rusang): So Kwang-hun
 Electoral District (Changhung): Han Tong-wan
 Electoral District (Yonggwang): Kim Yong-chun
 Electoral District (Sujon): U Tal-ho
 Electoral District (Tonghung): Cho Chong-kil
 Electoral District (Yongsong): Kim Jong-il
 Electoral District (Sinhung): Kim Tae-ok
 Electoral District (Punghung): Ri Kun-mo
 Electoral District (Palchon): Hong Tuk-yong
 Electoral District (Pujon): Yang Yohg-kyok
 Electoral District (Changjin): An Sung-hak
 Electoral District (Sasu): Kim Song-chol
 Electoral District (Pongdae): Kim Yong-chae
 Electoral District (Chongpyong): Yu Pyong-ok
 Electoral District (Yulsong): Yi Pong-won
 Electoral District (Sinsang): Pak Kyong-hwan
 Electoral District (Sondon): Kim Kil-yon
 Electoral District (Kumya): Chong Mun-san
 Electoral District (Chungnam): Yun Myong-kun
 Electoral District (Chinhung): O Tu-ik
 Electoral District (Innung): Yi Yon-su
 Electoral District (Pompo): So Tong-nak
 Electoral District (Yodok): Kim Sok-hyong
 Electoral District (Kowon): Yi Pong-kyu
 Electoral District (Puraesan): Kim Chu-yong
 Electoral District (Sudong): Sin Song-u
 Electoral District (Changdong): Cho Hum-ki
 Electoral District (Ungok): Hong Si-hak
 Electoral District (Kunhwa): Son Pyong-tu
 Electoral District (Sinam): Kim Chong-on
 Electoral District (Chongam): Choe Man-hyon
 Electoral District (Nakyang): Han Chong-hun
 Electoral District (Hamgang): Sin Chang-yol
 Electoral District (Chongsong): Chi Yong-sop
 Electoral District (Namhyang): Kim Tong-han
 Electoral District (Malum): Hyon Yong-hui
 Electoral District (Sunam): Pak Won-kuk
 Electoral District (Songpyong): Yi Tong-su
 Electoral District (Sabong): Tong Sun-mo
 Electoral District (Kangdok): Cho Tae-ryong
 Electoral District (Nanam): Chon Myong-sim
 Electoral District (Punggok): Kim Tong-chol
 Electoral District (Namchongjin): Choe Hyon-tae
 Electoral District (Puyun): Kim Chun-kum
 Electoral District (Haksong): Pang Chol-san
 Electoral District (Tanso): Chon Yong-hun
 Electoral District (Chegang): Kim Yong-nam
 Electoral District (Sinpyongdong): Chang Tae-sik
 Electoral District (Yonho): Choe Ung-su
 Electoral District (Songam): An Nong-sik
 Electoral District (Anhwa): Kim Yi-chang
 Electoral District (Chonggyaedong): Yi Sok
 Electoral District (Kwanhae): Kim Ku-chong
 Electoral District (Kilchu): Kim Chl-hun
 Electoral District (Yongbuk): Kim Wan-chin
 Electoral District (Chunam): Choe Sang-pyok
 Electoral District (Ilsin): So Kum-ok
 Electoral District (Wangjaesan): Nam Tae-kuk
 Electoral District (Hwadae): Kim Se-yong
 Electoral District (Pullo): Chon Yong-chun
 Electoral District (Myongchong): Kim Kuk-hun
 Electoral District (Kocham): Kim Chang-kyu
 Electoral District (Hwasong): YiKwi-nok
 Electoral District (Kuktong): Nam Chong-kl
 Electoral District (Orang): Kim Sun-sil
 Electoral District (Odaejin): Yi Chun-pok
 Electoral District (Kyongsong): Sin Yon-ok
 Electoral District (Hamyon): Pak Chang-sik
 Electoral District (Sungam): Choe Chong-kun
 Electoral District (Puryong): Pak Choi-song
 Electoral District (Songmak): Kim Won-pok
 Electoral District (Yonsa): Hwang Sun-myong
 Electoral District (Musan): Ko Hak-chin
 Electoral District (Kangson): Chon Sung-kuk
 Electoral District (Hoeryong): Pak Yong-sun
 Electoral District (Soedol): Cho Se-ung
 Electoral District (Taedok): Choe Chang-sik
 Electoral District (Yuson): Yi Ok-sun
 Electoral District (Mangyang): Pyon Sung-u
 Electoral District (Onsong): Chong Hae-son
 Electoral District (Chuwon): Yi Won-ho
 Electoral District (Chongsong): An Munition
 Electoral District (Saebyol): Kith Suhg-chin
 Electoral District (Kogonwon): Han Hae-tong
 Electoral District (Yongbukku): Kim Chae-hwan
 Electoral District (Undok): Chon Pyong-ho
 Electoral District (Obong): Yi Chong-pom
 Electoral District (Haksong): Kim Pung-ki
 Electoral District (Sonbong): Chang Chun-ho
 Electoral District (Tumangang): Yi Kil-song
 Electoral District (Huchang): Yi Ki-hwa
 Electoral District (Sinpa): Kim Pun-ok
 Electoral District (Samsu): Kim Yong-tuk
 Electoral District (Pungsan): U Tong-che
 Electoral District (Pungso): Kim Yong-hyok
 Electoral District (Kapsan): Yu Chang-won
 Electoral District (Tongjom): Ri Jong-ok
 Electoral District (Paegam): Yim Ho-kun
 Electoral District (Yonam): Yo Pyong-nam
 Electoral District (Unhung): Pak Sam
 Electoral District (Oesang): Yi Pyong-uk
 Electoral District (Hyetan): Pak Chae-yon
 Electoral District (Hyesan): Kim Chi-se
 Electoral District (Hyemyong): Yi Yong-u
 Electoral District (Wiyon): Hong Song-nam
 Electoral District (Yonbongdong): Chang In-suk
 Electoral District (Chundong): Yim Tok-un
 Electoral District (Pochon): Kim Won-chon
 Electoral District (Samjiyon): Hwang Sun-hui
 Electoral District (Taehongdan): Pak Kun-su
 Electoral District (Sungjon): Kim Yong-chon
 Electoral District (Manwol): Kwori Yong-ok
 Electoral District (Tongil): Yi In-ho
 Electoral District (Sonjuk): Pak Chung-kuk
 Electoral District (Kaepung): Kim Yong-sun
 Electoral District (Yongsan): Kwon Hui-kyong
 Electoral District (Haeson): Kim Tae-kyom
 Electoral District (Panmuh): O Kuk-yol
 Electoral District (Wolchong): Kim Kyong-chun
 Electoral District (Changpung): Yi Ha-il
 Electoral District (Chaha): Kim Ki-son
 Electoral District (Taedoksan): Yi Kyong-suk
 Electoral District (Hupo): Han Yun-chang
 Electoral District (Haean): Kiin Pok-sin
 Electoral District (Yokchondong): Kim Chong-kwan
 Electoral District (Sangdaedu): No Pyong-taek
 Electoral District (Konguk): Pae Un-yong
 Electoral District (Waudo): Pyon Chang-pok
 Electoral District (Yongjong): Chang Tae-pong
 Electoral District (Saegil): Pak Sung-il
 Electoral District (Taedae): Kim Yong-sam
 Electoral District (Kiyang): Yang Myong-suk
 Electoral District (Sohak): Yi Sung-hun
 Electoral District (Chongsan): Kim Yohg-suk
 Electoral District (Tokhung): Chong Tu-chan
 Electoral District (Chamjin): Yi Chong-sun
 Electoral District (Ponghwadong): Choe Sari-yun
 Electoral District (Talma): Pang Yohg-tok
 Electoral District (Wonjong): Yu Hyon-kyu
 Electoral District (Posan): Chang In-sok
 Electoral District (Pogu): Chong Yohg-kil
 Electoral District (Taean): Kim Il-sung
 Electoral District (Muhaksan): Yi Tuj-sil
 Electoral District (Yonggang): Yom Ki-sun
 Electoral District (Okto): Yim Ki-hwan
 Electoral District (Hyangsan): Chong Yoh-uk

References

Further reading

External links
North Korean parliamentary election, 1986 at Inter-Parliamentary Union

Elections in North Korea
Parliametary
North Korea
Supreme People's Assembly
North Korea
Election and referendum articles with incomplete results